The Phu Phan mountains are a range of hills dividing the Khorat Plateau of the Isan region of Thailand into two basins: the northern Sakhon Nakhon Basin, and the southern Khorat Basin.

The silhouette of the Phu Phan Mountains appears in the provincial seal of Kalasin since they form the northern boundary of the province.

The Phu Phan mountains are among the places in Thailand more severely affected by the Illegal logging of Phayung (Siamese Rosewood) trees. Although officially a protected tree, the cutting and trading of the endangered rosewood trees has been going unabated in Thailand's mountainous forested zones, even in the protected areas. In Thailand and in China this wood is highly valued in the furniture industry.

Etymology
The name of the range is derived from the characteristic tabletop shape of its peaks, for phan is a kind of traditional tray on a pedestal.

Phu is the word for mountain in the Isan/Lao language (as opposed to khao in central and southern Thai and doi in northern Thai).

Geography
The Phu Phan Mountains rise above the plateau and are not prominent. They straddle most of the provinces of northern and eastern Isan, including Khon Kaen, Nong Bua Lamphu, Udon Thani, Sakon Nakhon, Nakhon Phanom, Kalasin, Roi Et, Maha Sarakham, and Mukdahan Province. 

The highest elevation of the Phu Phan Range is the 641 m high summit known as Phu Lang Ka. It is in Nakhon Phanom Province. Other important peaks are 624 m high Phu Mai Hia in Mukdahan Province and the 563 m high summit known as Phu Langka Nuea in Nakhon Phanom Province. 

The hills are mostly deforested, although patches covered with mixed deciduous forest remain in zones spread across the range.

Phu Phan Royal Palace is in the area, as is the Nam Un dam. Other local sights are Lake Nong Han near Sakon Nakhon and the Khmer-style chedi ruins of Phu Phek, dating from 1050.

Protected areas
The area of the Phu Phan mountains includes national parks and other protected areas:
 Phu Phan National Park
 Phu Wiang National Park
 Than Ngam Forest Park
 Kosam Phi Forest Park
 Nam Phong National Park
 Phu Faek Forest Park
 Phu Kao–Phu Phan Kham National Park
 Phu Pha Lek National Park
 Huai Huat National Park (Phu Pha Yon)
 Phu Phra Bat Buabok Forest Park

See also
Khok Kruat Formation

References

External links

NatureThai - Phu Phan National Park

 
Mountain ranges of Thailand
Geography of Kalasin province
Geography of Mukdahan province
Geography of Roi Et province
Geography of Maha Sarakham province
Geography of Udon Thani province
Geography of Khon Kaen province
Geography of Nong Bua Lamphu province
Geography of Sakon Nakhon province